Norman Sylla (born 27 September 1982) is a Guinean retired football striker.

Career

Club career
Prior to playing for the Belgian sides KSK Ronse and FCV Dender, Sylla played for the English side Banbury United and a host of other English non-league teams, including legendary status at his one season at Redditch United where he scored 22 goals. He had agreed a contract to come back for the following season, but didn't return from holiday and never came back to play for Redditch United again. He has been capped 31  for his country.

Personal life
Sylla is the brother-in-law of Olivier Dacourt.

References

External links
 
 

1982 births
Living people
Association football forwards
French footballers
French sportspeople of Guinean descent
Citizens of Guinea through descent
Guinean footballers
Guinea international footballers
Footballers from Paris
Oxford United F.C. players
Banbury United F.C. players
Havant & Waterlooville F.C. players
Barnet F.C. players
Tamworth F.C. players
Redditch United F.C. players
F.C.V. Dender E.H. players
A.F.C. Tubize players
K.S.K. Ronse players
Denizlispor footballers
Guinean expatriate sportspeople in England
Expatriate footballers in England
Guinean expatriate sportspeople in Belgium
Expatriate footballers in Belgium
Guinean expatriate sportspeople in Turkey
Expatriate footballers in Turkey
Guinean expatriate sportspeople in Greece
Expatriate footballers in Greece
Black French sportspeople